Charles Albert Ferdinand Gobert, comte d'Aspremont Lynden (31 October 1888 - 21 June 1967) was a Belgian landowner, politician and cabinet minister. He was also a member of the right wing of the Catholic Party. He was the father of Harold Charles d'Aspremont Lynden, another politician and cabinet minister.

Born in Brussels, he became a doctor of law. He was elected a senator (1936-1939 and 1946-1961) and a representative (1939-1946) for the 
arrondissement of Dinant-Philippeville. He served as Minister for Agriculture (1939-1940) and Minister Without Portfolio (1940-1944), both in the Belgian Government in Exile. He died in Natoye.

References

Politicians from Brussels
1888 births
1967 deaths
Counts of Belgium
Walloon politicians
Ministers of Agriculture of Belgium
Government ministers of Belgium
Members of the Senate (Belgium)
Lynden family
Catholic Party (Belgium) politicians